Sergei Sergeyevich Serchenkov (born 1 January 1997) is a Russian football midfielder. He plays for FC KAMAZ Naberezhnye Chelny.

Club career
He made his Russian Premier League debut on 7 March 2015 for FC Ural Yekaterinburg in a game against FC Zenit Saint Petersburg.

On 11 February 2018, he joined the Armenian club FC Alashkert on loan.

References

External links
 
 
 

1997 births
Sportspeople from Krasnodar
Living people
Russian footballers
Russia youth international footballers
Association football midfielders
FC Ural Yekaterinburg players
FC Orenburg players
FC Alashkert players
FC Rotor Volgograd players
FC KAMAZ Naberezhnye Chelny players
Russian Premier League players
Russian First League players
Russian Second League players
Armenian Premier League players
Russian expatriate footballers
Expatriate footballers in Armenia
Russian expatriate sportspeople in Armenia